Gordon Charles Dangerfield (27 September 1885 – 9 June 1946) was an Australian rules footballer who played for St Kilda in the Victorian Football League (VFL).

A strong marking half back, Dangerfield missed some early matches in the 1908 season as he had returned to his former club Brighton for their inaugural VFA season. He spent a total of 12 seasons at St Kilda, captaining them in 1911 and 1915. He was a centre half back in their 1913 VFL Grand Final loss to Fitzroy. In 1920, he returned to Brighton and the following season was appointed coach.

References

Holmesby, Russell and Main, Jim (2007). The Encyclopedia of AFL Footballers. 7th ed. Melbourne: Bas Publishing.

1885 births
Australian rules footballers from Melbourne
Australian Rules footballers: place kick exponents
St Kilda Football Club players
Brighton Football Club players
Brighton Football Club coaches
1946 deaths
People from St Kilda, Victoria